FC Smolensk is a Russian association football club based in Smolensk, playing at the Spartak Stadium. The club was established by the initiative of the Government of Smolensk Oblast.

History
The club was founded in 2019 to replace FC Dnepr Smolensk, after Dnepr was relegated from the fourth-tier Russian Amateur Football League, at the end of 2018–19 season.

For the 2020–21 season, it was licensed for the third-tier Russian Professional Football League. On 2 August 2021, it dropped out of the league after the owner Vladimir Savchenkov issued an open letter stating that he cannot continue to finance the club.

References

External links

Football clubs in Russia
Association football clubs established in 2018
Sport in Smolensk
2018 establishments in Russia
Sport in Smolensk Oblast